Keith M. Aucoin (born November 6, 1978) is an American former professional ice hockey player who played in the National Hockey League (NHL) for the Carolina Hurricanes, Washington Capitals, New York Islanders, and St. Louis Blues.

Playing career
He was raised in Waltham and then Chelmsford, Massachusetts, and attended Chelmsford High School. Aucoin spent four seasons with Norwich University in Northfield, Vermont, before turning professional in 2001. Aucoin made his NHL debut during the 2005–06 NHL season with the Carolina Hurricanes. It was at the end of this season that he was a member of the "Black Aces," a group of players kept on the roster as healthy scratches for the Hurricanes' playoff run that ended with the Hurricanes being crowned Stanley Cup champions. Aucoin did not have his name added to the cup as he did not play in any of the playoff games, but can be seen on the ice during the celebration and did receive a championship ring. He would go on to play 53 regular season games for the Hurricanes over three seasons, scoring 5 goals and 15 points.

On July 3, 2008, Aucoin signed with the Washington Capitals. After attending the Capitals training camp for the 2008–09 season, the Capitals sent Aucoin to their AHL affiliate, the Hershey Bears. Aucoin's presence with Hershey had an immediate impact as he won the Reebok Player of the Week honors on October 12, 2008, and then the AHL Player of the Month for October 2008. In his first 20 games of 2008, he scored 8 goals with 21 assists. In December 2008, Aucoin was called up to the NHL with the Capitals, playing in 12 games, scoring two goals and assisting on four. He was reassigned back to the Bears for the playoffs where he won the Calder Cup in six games over the Manitoba Moose.

During the 2009–10 season, Aucoin was re-signed to a two-year contract extension on March 8, 2010. In helping the Bears capture a second consecutive Calder Cup, he was awarded the Les Cunningham Award as the league's most valuable player during the regular season.

For the 2011–12 season, Aucoin made the Capitals opening night roster due to injuries of other forwards. He played in 27 games for 11 points over the course of the season and was a regular in the playoffs.  It was the most time he spent in the NHL since 2008.

On July 21, 2012, Keith signed a one-year two-way deal with the Toronto Maple Leafs organization. With the intention to bolster the offense of Maple Leafs affiliate, the Toronto Marlies, Aucoin was directly assigned to the AHL to start the 2012–13 season. After the resolution of the NHL lockout, Aucoin was recalled to the Maple Leafs training camp. On reassignment to the Marlies, he was claimed off waivers from the New York Islanders on January 17, 2013. Despite the shortened season, Aucoin played his first full season in the NHL. In 41 games, he produced 6 goals and 12 points in a checking line role and helped the Islanders return to the playoffs for the first time since 2007.

On July 5, 2013, Keith signed as a free agent to a one-year deal with the St. Louis Blues organization. Aucoin's contract with the Blues was not renewed at the end of the season.

On June 13, 2014, after failing to secure a tryout with any other NHL team, Aucoin signed a two-year deal with Swiss club, HC Ambrì-Piotta of the National League A. Aucoin enjoyed a successful debut season in Europe with Piotta, contributing with 31 points in 41 regular season games. Unable to progress to the playoffs, Aucoin left Switzerland after one season, to sign a one-year contract in Germany with EHC München of the Deutsche Eishockey Liga (DEL) on June 19, 2015. He remained with EHC München for his final three seasons before officially retiring in 2018.

Family
Keith's younger brother, Phil Aucoin (born 1981), also played professional ice hockey.

Career statistics

Awards
 1999–00: First All-Conference Team (ECAC East)
 1999–00: Player of the Year (ECAC East)
 2000–01: First All-Conference Team (ECAC East)
 2000–01: Player of the Year (ECAC East)
 2005–06: Second Team All-Star (American Hockey League)
 2006–07: Second Team All-Star (American Hockey League)
 2007–08: All-Star Team CPT(American Hockey League)
 2008–09: All-Star (American Hockey League)
 2008–09: American Hockey League Leader in Assists
 2008–09: American Hockey League Calder Cup Champion
 2009–10: All-Star (American Hockey League)
 2009–10: American Hockey League Leader in Assists
 2009–10: John B. Sollenberger Trophy (American Hockey League) Leading Scorer
 2009–10: Les Cunningham Award (American Hockey League) Most Valuable Player
 2009–10: American Hockey League Calder Cup Champion
 2010–11: Second All-Star Team (American Hockey League)
 2011–12: All-Star (American Hockey League)
 2015–16: DEL  Champion 
 2016–17: DEL  Champion
 2017–18: DEL  Champion

References

External links

 

1978 births
Living people
Albany River Rats players
HC Ambrì-Piotta players
American men's ice hockey centers
B.C. Icemen players
Carolina Hurricanes players
Chicago Wolves players
Cincinnati Mighty Ducks players
Florida Everblades players
Hershey Bears players
Ice hockey players from Massachusetts
Lowell Lock Monsters players
Memphis RiverKings players
EHC München players
New York Islanders players
Norwich Cadets men's ice hockey players
People from Chelmsford, Massachusetts
Sportspeople from Waltham, Massachusetts
Sportspeople from Middlesex County, Massachusetts
Providence Bruins players
St. Louis Blues players
Toronto Marlies players
Undrafted National Hockey League players
Washington Capitals players
Chelmsford High School alumni